Pleasure Bend is an unincorporated community and census-designated place in St. John the Baptist Parish, Louisiana, United States. Its population was 250 as of the 2010 census. In 2020, its population declined to 212.

Geography

Demographics 

As of the 2020 United States census, there were 212 people, 101 households, and 47 families residing in the CDP.

References

Unincorporated communities in St. John the Baptist Parish, Louisiana
Unincorporated communities in Louisiana
Census-designated places in St. John the Baptist Parish, Louisiana
Census-designated places in Louisiana